The history of Internet in Sweden can be considered to have begun in 1984, when the first Swedish network was connected to the Internet in Gothenburg. In the past, however, were data links between some colleges and universities with access via modem and UUCP to the European part of the Internet.

History 
The Internet's predecessor ARPANET took its start around 1969 in California, USA. Patrick Falstrom was a mathematics student in Stockholm in the early 1980s when he was hired to help build and test the infrastructure for the ARPA Internet.

Although Sweden had connected to the internet in 1984, it was not until 1988 that this access was considered significant, when the higher education network SUNET was able to connect with the USA. Internet access became available to the Swedish public in 1994 when Kuai Connection and later Algonet as the first operators connected the Swedish Internet with the Swedish telephone network via modem pools.  
The usage costs were made up of a fixed monthly fee and per minute charges as with any other telephone call. In 1996 Internet access became available for a flat monthly fee in Ängelholm where the local cable TV company began to offer connectivity via Cable TV modems with an Ethernet interface. A big change started in 1999 when Bredbandsbolaget concluded a Framework Agreement with housing movement HSB and a large number of condominium apartments were given access to the Internet. This led Telia to come up with a similar offer, and soon a market was created where Bredbandsbolaget and Telia were just two of several players. In 2001, ADSL was made available, in beginning only from Telia who decided over the existing copper cables.

Timeline 
The timeline of the history of the Internet in Sweden:

1971 Televerket (later Telia) abolished the monopoly on mobile (radio) terminals.

1978 The first electronic discussion forum (BBS) were started in Sweden by Stockholms Datamaskincentral (QZ).

1979-1993 Televerket run their Datavision service that people connected to with a modem and a special software and subscription. It was offered commercially in 1982. Many larger companies embraced the service, but it did not become widespread elsewhere. Steve Jobs declared in 1984 that the service were "too single minded". It was shutdown later. But even during their active time resistance arose to electronic alternatives: "The association of newspaper publishers to the government asserted a strong concern about the competition Videotex would entail for the newspapers. An inquiry majority proposed a ban on advertising."

1979-1988 The network of Swedish universities (Sunet) used Televerket X.25 but did later leave this inefficient protocol behind permanently in favor of leased direct connections.

1980 The first volunteer-driven electronic discussion forum (BBS) which were available via modem connection was started by the club for ABC-computers.

1983 The exclusive right for the state monopoly Televerket to supply a modems for speeds up to  ceased.

1983 Some Swedish Social Democrats tried to get a tax on the use of computers, see motion "1983/84:596 av Kurt Ove Johansson (s) och Stig Gustafsson (s) I molionen yrkas atl riksdagen hos regeringen begär en utredning om alt beskatta eller avgiftsbelägga användningen av datorer." (sic!) ("1983/84: 596 Kurt Ove Johansson (s) and Stig Gustafsson (s) in the motion claims insist that the parliament to the government request an investigation into taxing or charging for the use of computers").

1984 The very first Swedish network 192.5.50.0 was connected to the Internet by Ulf Bilting at Chalmers University of Technology.

The choice of IP as the network protocol was not settled or clear: "many networkers within the nordunet community never really regarded osi as an option, but were from the start determined to build a tcp/ip network. osi remained in the nordunet plans only because it was pushed so strongly by the European Commission."

2020 Swedish regulators banned the use of networking equipment from Huawei and ZTE its 5G network.

See also
History of the Internet
Internet in Sweden

References

History of the Internet
Internet in Sweden